Northeast Community College (NECC) is a public community college system in northeast Nebraska with four campuses: Norfolk, O'Neill, South Sioux City, and West Point. The college was established by the state legislature in 1973. It was created by a merger of Northeastern Nebraska College and Northeast Nebraska Technical College.

References

Two-year colleges in the United States
Community colleges in Nebraska
Educational institutions established in 1973
Education in Madison County, Nebraska
Education in Holt County, Nebraska
Education in Dakota County, Nebraska
Education in Cuming County, Nebraska
Buildings and structures in Madison County, Nebraska
1973 establishments in Nebraska
NJCAA athletics